A Wanted Man is the seventeenth book in the Jack Reacher series written by Lee Child. It was published on 30 August 2012 in the United Kingdom, Australia, & New Zealand and on 11 September 2012 in the USA & Canada. A Wanted Man won the "Thriller & Crime Novel of the Year" award by the National Book Awards.

The book returns to the present timeline, continuing where Worth Dying For left off, whereas the preceding novel, The Affair, told some episode of the main character's past. The novel, like a majority of the Jack Reacher novels, is set in third-person point of view.

Plot
The novel opens with Jack Reacher, whose nose is broken from his last adventure (Worth Dying For), trying to get a ride out of Nebraska, hitch-hiking in the middle of the night, without any car stopping for him. Only after an hour and a half of waiting, two men and a woman let him climb in and even drive some part of the way. They introduce themselves as Donald McQueen, Alan King, and Karen Delfuenso. Reacher notices that the car's occupants tell him lies and that the woman is very nervous. They insist he drives for a while as they rest and take shifts at driving. McQueen and King sleep, though Karen does not. They pass two roadblocks where the highway police searches for some wanted fugitives in tuxedos who killed a man and took off in a Mazda. The car is found with fingerprints; it is then believed by FBI agent Julia Sorenson and Sheriff Victor Goodman that after the murders the men went to a park, where they kidnapped a cocktail waitress (Delfuenso) and stole her car, an Impala.

Karen repeatedly blinks, giving Reacher coded messages—which he manages to decode—and learns that the two men in the car are the wanted people the police are looking for and that Karen has been taken as hostage. Sorenson and Goodman's theory is proven correct after they visit a gas station called "All day, all night" and they examine the cameras facing across the street. After a visit at another gas station Reacher buys coffee for the group, but before doing so uses the store's phone to alert the cops. Sorenson, the closest to the area, drives over, but by then the group have left. McQueen becomes suspicious, and tells Reacher to use his bank card (which is a fraud) to rent rooms for the night. When doing so, he is attacked by McQueen, who fires his gun, and misses. McQueen, King, and Karen flee.

Reacher is apprehended by Sorenson, whose boss wants Reacher arrested. Sorenson is about to do so, but instead talks to Reacher and discovers a barn a few miles down. Going to the location, they find a car on fire with an unidentified body in it. They assume it is the body of Karen Delfuenso. Afterwards, Reacher requests Sorenson drop him off a mile away from the building she works at. However, Sorenson is told by Goodman that Lucy Delfuenso, Karen's daughter, has been kidnapped. Goodman explains he had told Lucy her mother was missing (she was at her friend's/neighbor's house), and suggested Lucy's friend's mother stay home. Lucy's friend's mother went to work, leaving the children home alone, and Lucy is kidnapped. They also later learn the two men have shot a third person and that some terrorist threat against the United States might be involved. Together they try to solve the case and catch the fugitives.

Karen has not been killed as expected, but reveals herself as an undercover agent with the FBI, and reveals that the body in the car was King. The other fugitive, McQueen, is also an undercover special agent with the FBI who tried to infiltrate some wannabe terrorist group "Wadia" who has threatened to pollute a huge drinking water aquifer with nuclear waste. Reacher, Lucy, Sorenson, Karen, and the eyewitness from the beginning of the novel have all ended up in some sort of witness-protection motel. Knowing that McQueen has gone off radar, Sorenson, Karen, and Reacher escape the motel to try save him. They are eventually able to locate the terrorists' hiding place, a huge ex-army bunker. Sorenson is shot by a sniper, "Headshot". Despite Karen's protests, Reacher enters and kills the gang one by one, in retaliation for Sorenson.

He comes upon Peter King, Alan King's older brother, who wants revenge for his brother's death. McQueen might have been killed otherwise if he had not lied and said Reacher killed Alan. Reacher plays along and soon manages to kill Peter, but the ropes binding McQueen take up time and the remaining members of the group are all up in arms. Crucially helped by Karen Delfuenso at a fatal juncture, they successfully finish all and escape. The terrorist threat turns out to be a hoax because the group only claims to possess damaging material. In reality, there only exist some empty trailers from the time of the cold war that have been forgotten in some bunker, but never been used for nuclear material; they were being used by Wadia as a sort of virtual currency they could trade with terrorist groups, making their whole establishment nothing more than an illegal "bank". 
They and Karen drive off as Reacher explains to McQueen the answer to a question Reacher had asked Alan King earlier in the book: "Can you talk for a minute without using the letter A?".
The answer is you can do it by counting from one to one hundred. The first letter "A" being the "and" in one hundred and one.

Continuation
The novel is a sequel to Worth Dying For, despite its predecessor being The Affair which is a prequel novel.
The following novel is Never Go Back and is a sequel, not prequel, to Worth Dying For and A Wanted Man in the series continuity, unlike The Affair.

Response
The book was a commercial success selling over a million copies worldwide and was No. 1 on many booksellers' lists for numerous weeks. However, it received mixed reviews. Many enjoyed the book, but thought its ending was too detailed and a major criticism of the United States major security response to 9/11. The novel also criticised the CIA for being silly and lazy, while the FBI is given a far better judgment.

References

External links

2012 British novels
English novels
Jack Reacher books
Third-person narrative novels
Bantam Press books

sv:Värt att dö för (bok)